Lorna Zarina Aponte (born 11 May 1983 in Panama City), better known simply as Lorna, is a female reggaeton artist best known for her song "Papi chulo... (te traigo el mmmm...)" (#1 in France, #2 in Italy, Belgium, #4 in the Netherlands, #12 in Switzerland, #49 in Sweden).

At the age of 19, Aponte decided that she wanted to become a singer and solo artist and so she went searching for, and found, a music producer and DJ who was willing to record a song. With help from this producer, she entered a talent competition for new singers organised in Panama City which she won. This gave Aponte the opportunity to record a single. Soon after, she was working with El Chombo, a producer in Panama. In 2005, Aponte was scheduled to appear at a festival in Bilbao called Zorrozaurre, but instead of her, the record company sent one of her backing singers claiming that Lorna had decided to take a sabbatical due to health related issues. The backing singer also gave interviews under the impression of being Aponte.

References

1983 births
Living people
21st-century Panamanian women singers
21st-century Panamanian singers
Panamanian reggaeton musicians
People from Panama City